Venkata Prabhu Prasad (born 1 May 1989), known professionally as Saptagiri, is an Indian actor and comedian who works in Telugu films. He received Nandi Award as Best Male Comedian for his role in Express Raja (2016). He received Santosham Allu Ramalingaiah Smarakam Award at 15th Santosham Film Awards in 2017.

Early life
Saptagiri was born and brought up in Irala village of Chittoor district in Andhra Pradesh. His father was a guard in forest department. Though his birthname was Venkata Prabhu Prasad, Saptagiri changed his name after an incident which happened in Tirumala.

Career
Sapthagiri moved to Hyderabad to pursue his career in acting, and struggled a lot before getting a break. He started film acting career with Bhaskar's film Bommarillu  he used to work as an assistant director. Saptagiri got a chance to play a comedian role. He earned name as a Mini Brahmanandam in terms of remuneration and fame in low budget comedy movies.

Saptagiri who started his career as an assistant director and turned as an actor. He acted as a comedian in many films. He made his debut as a lead role in Saptagiri Express (2016). In 2017, he played the lead in Sapthagiri LLB.

Filmography

Actor

Producer 
Bhagyanagara Veedullo Gamattu (2019)

References

External links 
 
 

Telugu comedians
Telugu male actors
Living people
1989 births
People from Chittoor district
Male actors from Andhra Pradesh
Indian male comedians
Male actors in Telugu cinema
Indian male actors
Indian male film actors
Santosham Film Awards winners
Nandi Award winners